Yunqing Tang is a mathematician specialising in number theory and arithmetic geometry and an Assistant Professor at University of California, Berkeley. She was awarded the SASTRA Ramanujan Prize in 2022 for "having established, by herself and in collaboration, a number of striking results on some central problems in arithmetic geometry and number theory". 

Yunqing Tang was born in China and secured a BSc degree from Beijing University in 2011 and then moved to Harvard University for higher education from where she graduated with a Ph D degree in 2016 under the guidance of Mark Kisin.  She was associated with Princeton University in several capacities. First she was with the IAS Princeton during 2016-2017, then as an instructor from July 2017 to Jan 2020 and then as an assistant professor from July 2021 to June 2022, In between, she worked as a researcher at CNRS from February 2020 to June 2021. She is with University of California, Berkeley since July 2022.

Work
The citation for SASTRA Ramnujan Prize summarizes Yunqing Tang's contributions to mathematics thus:

"The prize notes that her works display a remarkable combination of sophisticated techniques, in which the arithmetic and geometry of modular curves and of Shimura varieties play a central role, and have strong links with the discoveries of Srinivasa Ramanujan in the area of modular equations. ... she established a new special case of the Ogus conjecture concerning cycles in de Rham cohomology of abelian varieties. She has shown that any abelian surface with real multiplication has infinitely many primes with split reduction.  She resolved of the long-standing unbounded coefficient conjecture of Atkin and Swinnertin-Dyer that algebraic functions which are not invariant under any congruence subgroup of SL2(Z), must have unbounded denominators. The study of algebraic functions that are related to the moduli of elliptic integrals, stems from Ramanujan’s own investigations and the plethora of beautiful modular identities that he discovered."

Awards and recognition

The awards and recognition conferred on Yunqing Tang include:

SASTRA Ramanujan Prize, 2022.
AWM Dissertation Prize, awarded for outstanding Ph.D dissertations by female students in the US, 2016.
New World Mathematics Award, Gold Medal for Ph.D thesis awarded for outstanding Chinese mathematics students worldwide, 2016.
Merit Research Fellowship, Graduate School of Arts and Sciences, Harvard University, 2015 – 2016.

References

Recipients of the SASTRA Ramanujan Prize
Living people
Year of birth missing (living people)
University of California, Berkeley faculty
Peking University alumni
Princeton University faculty
Harvard University alumni